Yun Yeongseon (윤영선; 尹永善, 1896–1987) was a South Korean politician, businessman, and social activist. He was the son of Yun Chi-ho. His nickname was Odang. His American name was Allen Yun, while he also adopted the Japanese name Ito Yonsen (伊東永善) when Korea was under Japanese rule.

1896 births
1987 deaths
South Korean politicians
South Korean people of Chinese descent
Yun Chi-ho